Guillaume Cossou (born 29 June 1979) is a French karateka who won a bronze medal in the male open kumite at the 2004 European Karate Championships. Guillaume's brother Mathieu Cossou is also a karateka.

References

French male karateka
Living people
1979 births
Place of birth missing (living people)
21st-century French people